Anna Fienberg  is an Australian writer of young adult fiction and children's literature.

Biography
Fienberg was born in 1956 in England before moving to Australia at the age of three. She has worked as an editor for School Magazine. In 1988 her first work was published, entitled Billy Bear and the Wild Winter. In 1989 Fienberg released her first novel, The Nine Lives of Balthazar. She has won the Children's Book of the Year Award: Younger Readers in 1992 for The Magnificent Nose and Other Marvels and has been a short-list nominee on four other occasions. Fienberg has also won the Alan Marshall Award for Children's Literature in 1993 for Ariel, Zed & the Secret of Life and the 2003 Aurealis Award for best children's short fiction for Tashi and the Haunted House. She has also been an Aurealis Award finalist on four other occasions.  Fienberg was made a Member of the Order of Australia (AM) in the 2019 Queen's Birthday Honours in recognition of her "significant service to literature as an author".

Bibliography

Novels
The Nine Lives of Balthazar (1989, with Donna Gynell)
Ariel, Zed and the Secret of Life (1992, Kim Gamble)
Power to Burn (1995)
Borrowed Light (1999)
The Witch in the Lake (2001)
Horrendo's Curse (2002)
Number 8 (2007)

Chapter books
Tashi (with Barbara Fienberg and Kim Gamble)
Tashi (1995)
Tashi and the Giants (1995)
Tashi and the Ghosts (1996)
Tashi and the Genie (1997)
Tashi and the Baba Yaga (1998)
Tashi and the Demons (1999)
Tashi and the Big Stinker (2001)
Tashi and the Dancing Shoes (2002)
Tashi and the Haunted House (2002)
Tashi and the Royal Tomb (2003)
There Once Was a Boy Called Tashi (2003)
Tashi Lost in the City (2004)
Tashi and the Forbidden Room (2005)
Tashi and the Stolen Bus (2006)
Tashi and the Mixed-up Monster (2007)
Tashi and the Phoenix (2008)
Tashi and the Golem (2009)

Other books
Billy Bear and the Wild Winter (1988)
Wiggy and Boa (1988, with Ann James)
Dead Sailors Don't Bite (1996, with Ann James)
Pirate Trouble for Wiggy and Boa (1996, with Ann James)

Collections
X-Change: Stories for a New Century (2000)
The Big, Big, Big Book of Tashi (2001, with Barbara Fienberg and Kim Gamble).  Includes Tashi (1995), Tashi and the Giants (1995), Tashi and the Ghosts (1996), Tashi and the Genie (1997), Tashi and the Baba Yaga (1998), Tashi and the Demons (1999), Tashi and the Big Stinker (2001).
Tashi: 2 Books in One (2003, with Barbara Fienberg)
The Second Big Big Book of Tashi (2006, with Barbara Fienberg and Kim Gamble).  Includes Tashi and the Dancing Shoes (2002), Tashi and the Haunted House (2002), Tashi and the Royal Tomb (2003), Tashi Lost in the City (2004), and Tashi and the Forbidden Room (2005).
The Great Big Enormous Book of Tashi (Tashi #1–16) Minton Goes!: Underwater & Home at Last (2008, with Kim Gamble)Minton Goes!: Driving and Trucking (2008, with Kim Gamble)Minton Goes!: Sailing and Flying (2008, with Kim Gamble)

Picture books
Minton (with Kim Gamble)Minton Goes Flying (1998)Minton Goes Sailing (1998)Minton Goes Driving (1999)Minton Goes Trucking (1999)Minton Goes Home (2000)Minton Goes Under (2000)

Other booksThe Magnificent Nose and Other Marvels (1991, with Kim Gamble)The Hottest Boy Who Ever Lived (1995, with Kim Gamble)Madeline the Mermaid and Other Fishy Tales (1995, with Ann James)Joseph (2001, with Kim Gamble)

Short fiction
"Eyeball to Eyeball" in Weird: Twelve Incredible Tales (ed. Penny Matthews)

Other worksEddie (1988)Con the Whiz Kid (1989, with Felicity Meyer and the Roads & Traffic Authority)The Champion (1989, with Felicity Meyer and the Roads & Traffic Authority)My Goldie (1989, with Felicity Meyer and the Roads & Traffic Authority)Stefano's Nonna (1989, with Felicity Meyer and the Roads & Traffic Authority)A Teddy for Louise, Please (1994, with Felicity Meyer and the Roads & Traffic Authority)Snugglepot and Cuddlepie (1997, with Vicky Kitanov)Snugglepot and Cuddlepie Meet Little Obelia (1997, with Vicky Kitanov and May Gibbs)Snugglepot and Cuddlepie at Sea (1997, with Vicky Kitanov)Cuddlepie Goas to the Dentist (1997, with Vicky Kitanov and May Gibbs)The world of May Gibbs (1997, with May Gibbs and Vicky Kitanov)The Doll's Secret (1997, with Australia Post)Snugglepot and Cuddlepie and the Banksia Men (1997, with Vicky Kitanov and May Gibbs)Snugglepot and Cuddlepie Go Home (1997, with Vicky Kitanov and May Gibbs)Hans Christian Andersen's Thumbelina (2002, with Mark Jackson, Heather Potter, HC Andersen)Escape (2009)The Amazing Tashi Activity Book (2009, with Barbara Fienberg and Kim Gamble)

Animation
Tashi (2014-2015, Seven Network)

Nominations and awards
Alan Marshall Award
Children's Literature
1993: Win: Ariel, Zed & the Secret of LifeAurealis Awards
Best children's short fiction
2002: Win: Tashi and the Haunted House2003: Nomination: Tashi and the Royal Tomb2004: Nomination: There Was Once a Boy Called Tashi2007: Nomination: Tashi and the Mixed-up MonsterBest young-adult novel
2001: Nomination: The Witch in the LakeCBCA Book of the Year Award
Older Readers
1999: Nomination: Borrowed LightYounger Readers
1988: Nomination: Wiggy and Boa1992: Win: The Magnificent Nose and Other Marvels1996: Nomination: Tashi2001: Nomination: Joseph''
 2014

References

External links
Allen & Unwin's Author Entry

Fantastic Fiction
WorldCat

1956 births
Living people
Australian children's writers
English emigrants to Australia
Australian women children's writers
Members of the Order of Australia